The Orangehead worm-eel (Scolecenchelys xorae) is an eel in the family Ophichthidae (worm/snake eels). It was described by J.L.B. Smith in 1958, originally under the genus Muraenichthys. It is a marine, subtropical eel which is known from the western Indian Ocean, including South Africa, Réunion, Mauritius and Madagascar.

References

Fish described in 1958
Scolecenchelys